Lukas Erhan Eberhard Gottwalt (born 16 September 1997) is a German professional footballer who plays as a centre-back for Göztepe.

References

External links
 
 

1997 births
Living people
Footballers from Frankfurt
German footballers
Turkish footballers
German people of Turkish descent
Association football central defenders
Boluspor footballers
1. FC Kaiserslautern II players
FSV Frankfurt players
Göztepe S.K. footballers
TFF First League players
Oberliga (football) players
Regionalliga players
3. Liga players